The Slana Spur Formation is a geological formation in Alaska. It preserves fossils dating back to the Permian period.

See also

 List of fossiliferous stratigraphic units in Alaska
 Paleontology in Alaska

References

Permian Alaska